Jetsun or Jetsunma (the "ma" suffix is feminine) is a Tibetan title meaning "venerable" or "reverend." It is a specific term applied to revered teachers and practitioners of Vajrayana Buddhism. The title is applied to adepts and learned lamas such as Jetsun Milarepa. "Je" (Wylie transliteration: rJe) refers to those of high rank, including kings and nobles; "tsun" (Wylie transliteration: bTsun) refers to 1) those of noble rank, 2) those who are monastics, or 3) those who combine the three characteristics of being learned, noble, and good. The two together emphasize the honorific while "tsun" applies the term specifically to ecclesiastics.

In terms of Jetsunmas, the title could refer to:

Jetsunma Chime Tenpai Nyima (rje btsun ma 'chi med bstan pa'i nyi ma) (b. 1756)
Jetsun Chonyi Dechen Tsomo
Jetsunma Dechen Wangmo
Jetsun Dolma
Jetsunma Ahkon Lhamo
Jétsunma Khandro Yeshé Réma
Jetsunma Kushok Chimey Luding, sister of Sakya Trizin
Jetsunma Niguma
Jetsun Milarepa
Jetsunma Mingyur Paldron, Minling Jetsunma Mingyur Peldron (smin gling rje btsun mi 'gyur dpal sgron, (1699-1769), daughter of Terton Terdak Lingpa
Jetsunma Pema Trinle
Jetsunma Shukseb, Shukseb Jetsun Choying Zangmo (shug gseb rje btsun chos dbyings bzang mo, (1865-1951)
 Jetsunma Tamdrin Wangmo Kelzang Chokyi Nyima (rje btsun ma grub pa'i rta mgrin dbang mo skal bzang chos kyi nyi ma) (1836-1896)
Jetsunma Tenzin Palmo, a well-known western yogini
Jetsunma Thinley Chodron
Jetsunma Tsewang Lhamo (1874-1950)
Jetsun Pema, Queen consort of Bhutan
Jetsun Pema, activist
Mindrolling Jetsün Khandro Rinpoche
Jetsun Namgyal  Wangchen (1934-2015) one of Tibets greatest living masters

Footnotes